Euliphyra hewitsoni, the western moth butterfly, is a butterfly in the family Lycaenidae. It is found in Senegal, Guinea, Sierra Leone, Liberia, Ivory Coast, Ghana, southern Nigeria and Cameroon. The habitat consists of forests.

Adults have a moth-like flight.

The larvae live in the nests of ants of the genus Oecophylla and feed on ant regurgitations and/or ant brood.

The name honours William Chapman Hewitson.

References

Seitz, A. Die Gross-Schmetterlinge der Erde 13: Die Afrikanischen Tagfalter. Plate XIII 65 d

Butterflies described in 1899
Miletinae
Butterflies of Africa
Taxa named by Per Olof Christopher Aurivillius